Macondo is a 2014 Austrian drama film directed by Sudabeh Mortezai. The film had its premiere in the competition section of the 64th Berlin International Film Festival.

Cast
 Aslan Elbiev
 Kheda Gazieva
 Ramasan Minkailov

References

External links
 

2014 films
2014 drama films
Austrian drama films
2010s German-language films
2014 directorial debut films